The Possession of Hannah Grace (also known in some countries as Cadaver) is a 2018 American supernatural horror thriller film directed by Diederik van Rooijen and written by Brian Sieve. It stars Shay Mitchell, Kirby Johnson, Stana Katic, Grey Damon and Nick Thune, and follows a former policewoman who encounters the supernatural while working in a morgue.

The film was released in the United States on November 30, 2018, by Sony Pictures Releasing. It was released under the Screen Gems label and received generally negative reviews from critics, but grossed $43 million worldwide.

Plot
During an exorcism ritual, the possessed Hannah Grace almost kills the priest by choking him while suspended in midair. Her father, Grainger, then suffocates her to death using a pillow, and as she dies the priest drops to the floor gasping for breath. As her father sobs over her dead body, a fly lands on her hand and it twitches ominously.

Three months later, Megan Reed, an ex-cop with the Boston Police Department struggles with depression and an addiction to pills after her patrol partner was shot dead by a criminal whom she failed to subdue. Megan's friend Lisa Roberts finds her a nightshift job in the Boston Metro Hospital's morgue, located in an intimidating brutalist architecture building (portrayed by Boston City Hall). During Megan's second shift, a man (later identified as Grainger) aggressively tries to convince her to let him into the building, but she denies and informs the two security guards Ernie Gainor and Dave. However, shortly after, Megan helps EMT Randy to move the corpse of a brutally murdered young woman (later identified as the one of Hannah Grace) into the building and the man secretly enters the building. Randy tells Megan a man stabbed Hannah  to death and was then caught in the act trying to burn her body in an alleyway.

When Megan tries to fingerprint and photograph Hannah's corpse, the camera explodes and the fingerprints return as illegible by the computer. Other strange things occur and Megan becomes more suspicious of the corpse. Megan subsequently researches on the internet only to find out that Hannah had died during an exorcism. She also notices that Hannah's bright blue eye color does not match the one listed on her driver's license. Megan soon encounters Grainger who had invaded the building trying to drag Hannah's corpse through the building. Alongside with the two security guards Ernie and Dave, Megan manages to subdue Grainger. The latter screams Hannah's corpse must be burnt because she isn't really dead, but they do not listen to him and have him arrested by the police.

Megan's ex-boyfriend, Andrew Kurtz, is still employed as an officer and responds to the scene. He agrees to help Megan identify the corpse after she tells him about the color of Hannah's eyes. Soon after, Andrew tells Megan that Hannah Grace had died three months earlier and asked Megan whether the given finger prints was Hannah's. Megan confirmed it and Andrew thought maybe there is some error in the computer data. Meanwhile, Hannah kills Dave by telekinetically lifting his body across the ceiling and into her refrigerated drawer in the morgue where she breaks his body. Soon after, Megan notices that some of the wounds on Hannah are missing, as if it had healed by itself. Investigating the security footage, Megan sees a glimpse of Hannah's corpse crawling around in the building. She shows the footage to Lisa who does not believe her and accuses her of having a relapse on her addiction to pills. Lisa is killed by Hannah soon after. When Randy returns to the morgue to deliver another corpse, Megan shows Randy the healing body of Hannah.

After Randy leaves the morgue, Megan notices that the lift closes by itself and is going down. Megan investigates the security footage and sees a glimpse of Hannah's body crawling inside the lift. She rushes down to the access bay to warn Randy, but Hannah has already killed him. Suddenly, Andrew calls Megan to warn her that Grainger has escaped police custody after killing the two officers transporting him. Moments later, Grainger forces Megan to take him to Hannah's body at gunpoint. Grainger explains to Megan that he is Hannah's father. He tells her that numerous exorcisms failed because the demon possessing her was too strong. So strong, in fact, that it is even able to possess Hannah's body after her death by killing people to heal itself. He tells her that Hannah had depression and it worsened until the demon was able to enter Hannah's body. The blue eye color is the sign of the demon possessing Hannah.  Grainger wonders why Hannah killed Dave and Lisa, but did not kill Megan. Megan agrees to help Grainger cremate Hannah, but she reanimates and pushes Grainger into the fire. Then she locks Megan inside her refrigerated drawer.

Andrew and Ernie come to Megan's help. Hannah kills Ernie and then tries to kill Andrew, but Megan forces herself to be calm. She picks up Andrew's firearm and shoots Hannah, then drags her to the crematorium while Andrew calls for backup. After a brief struggle before the incinerator, Megan pushes Hannah into the fire, eventually killing the demon. As the movie comes to a close, Megan recounts how she has managed to stay clean for over two months. As she looks into the mirror at her reflection, her hair covering one eye, a single fly -similar to the ones shown in several scenes involving Hannah's corpse earlier in the film- lands on the mirror's surface. Megan promptly smashes it with her hand as the movie ends, leading the audience to wonder whether the fly's appearance is simple coincidence, if Hannah's demon has somehow transferred her essence, in whole or in part, into Megan herself, or simply symbolic that Megan is strong enough to fight her depression, thus not letting any possessive demon to enter her body.

Cast 
 Shay Mitchell as Megan Reed, a troubled ex-cop who takes the graveyard shift in a morgue.
 Stana Katic as Lisa Roberts, a nurse and Megan's friend.
 Grey Damon as Andrew Kurtz, a police officer and Megan's ex-boyfriend.
 Kirby Johnson as Hannah Grace, a girl possessed and resurrected by demons.
 Nick Thune as Randy, an EMT and friend of Megan's.
 Jacob Ming-Trent as Ernie Gainor, a security guard at the hospital.
 Max McNamara as Dave, a security guard at the hospital who has a crush on Megan.
 Louis Herthum as Grainger, Hannah Grace's father.

Production

Development
On March 23, 2016, it was announced that Screen Gems hired Diederik van Rooijen to direct horror thriller Cadaver from a script by Brian Sieve, which Todd Garner and Sean Robins would produce through Broken Road Productions. The film was originally entitled Cadaver.

Casting
On June 6, 2016, Shay Mitchell joined the principal cast to play Megan Reed, and on October 28, Stana Katic was also cast in the film, along with Grey Damon, Nick Thune, Jacob Ming-Trent, Max McNamara, Louis Herthum and Kirby Johnson.

Filming
Principal photography on the film began on November 8, 2016, in Boston, Massachusetts, with the production team including director of photography Lennert Hillege, production designer Paula Loos, and costume designer Deborah Newhall. Filming would also take place at New England Studios in Devens, Massachusetts. The film was shot entirely on a Sony α7S II camera, marking the first time a feature film was shot using a mirrorless full-frame camera.

Release
The film was released in the United States and Canada on November 30, 2018. In several countries, including Brazil, Greece and Israel, it was released a day earlier on November 29, 2018.

On October 15, 2018, Sony released the first trailer online. The studio spent about $12 million on promoting the film.

Reception

Box office
The Possession of Hannah Grace grossed $14.8 million in the United States and Canada, and $28.2 million in other territories, for a total worldwide gross of $43 million, against a production budget of about $7.7 million.

In the United States and Canada, the film was projected to gross $3–7million from 2,065 theaters in its opening weekend. It made $2.6 million on its first day, including $625,000 from Thursday night previews. It went on to debut to $6.5 million, finishing seventh. Due to it being a "low-budget cash grab in the current slow marketplace," anything over $5.5 million would have been considered a success by Sony. In its second weekend the film dropped 51% to $3.2 million, an above-average hold for a horror film (which typically drop at least 60%).

Critical response

The website's critical consensus reads, "The Possession of Hannah Grace feints at real horror just often enough to offer hints of the movie it should have been -- and further frustrate viewers seeking a good scare." On Metacritic, the film has a weighted average score of 37 out of 100, based on 10 critics, indicating "generally unfavorable reviews". Audiences polled by CinemaScore gave the film an average grade of "C−" on an A+ to F scale, while those surveyed by PostTrak gave it a 36% overall positive score and a 24% "definite recommend."

References

External links 
 

2010s English-language films
2010s American films
2010s supernatural horror films
2010s supernatural thriller films
2018 horror thriller films
American horror thriller films
American supernatural horror films
American supernatural thriller films
Demons in film
Films about exorcism
Films directed by Diederik van Rooijen
Films scored by John Frizzell (composer)
Films shot in Boston
Films set in hospitals
Screen Gems films